Nicholas Condy (1793 – 8 January 1857) was an English painter.

Condy was supposed to have been born at Torpoint, in the then parish of Antony East, Cornwall, in 1793, but no entry of his baptism is to be found in the register kept at Antony Church. This is because he was actually baptised on 2 April 1793 in Withiel, Cornwall. Father: Nicholas; mother: Elizabeth. Father Nicholas Condy, of Mevagissey, had married Elizabeth Thomas in Withiel on 28 June 1790. However, a Nicholas Condy died in 1807 in Torpoint, presumably his father.

Condy married Ann Trevanion Pyle (1792–1860) on 3 October 1814 in Stoke Damerel, now Plymouth. Ann was from Falmouth and daughter of Captain Mark Oates of the Marines.  The couple had a son, maritime painter Nicholas Matthews Condy, who is often confused with him.

He was gazetted to the 43rd Regiment as an ensign on 9 May 1811, and served in the Peninsula; he became a Lieutenant on 24 February 1818, and was thenceforth on half-pay during the remainder of his life.

From 1818 he devoted his attention to art, and became a professional painter at Plymouth. He chiefly produced small oil paintings and water-colours on tinted paper, about eight inches by five inches, which he sold at prices ranging from fifteen shillings to one guinea each.

Between 1830 and 1845 he exhibited two landscapes at the Royal Academy, four at the British Institution, and one at Suffolk Street Gallery. His best known painting is entitled The Old Hall at Cotehele on a Rent-day. He brought out a work called Cotehele, on the Banks of the Tamar, the ancient seat of the Right Hon. the Earl of Mount-Edgcumbe, by N. Condy, with a descriptive account written by the Rev. F. V. J. Arundell, 17 plates, London, published by the author, at 17 Gate Street, Lincoln's Inn Fields, with text supplied by Francis Vyvyan Jago Arundell.

He died at 10 Mount Pleasant Terrace, Plymouth, aged 64, and was buried in St. Andrew's churchyard.

Paintings (selected
In the Scullery

References

External links 
 

Attribution

Landscape artists
19th-century English painters
English male painters
English watercolourists
43rd Regiment of Foot officers
British Army personnel of the Napoleonic Wars
People from Torpoint
1793 births
1857 deaths
19th-century English male artists